Big Time Wrestling (or NWA Big Time Wrestling) may refer to:

 50th State Big Time Wrestling, sometimes NWA Hawaii, a defunct professional wrestling promotion headquartered in Honolulu, Hawaii, United States
 Big Time Wrestling (Boston), a defunct professional wrestling promotion headquartered in Boston, Massachusetts, United States
 Big Time Wrestling (Detroit), sometimes NWA Big Time Wrestling or NWA Detroit, a defunct professional wrestling promotion headquartered in Detroit, Michigan, United States
 Big Time Wrestling (San Francisco), sometimes NWA San Francisco, a defunct professional wrestling promotion headquartered in San Francisco, California, United States
 NWA All-Star Wrestling, a defunct professional wrestling promotion headquartered in Vancouver, British Columbia, Canada originally known as Big Time Wrestling
 All Star Wrestling, an active professional wrestling promotion headquartered in Birkenhead, England which frequently trades under the alternative name Big Time Wrestling
 Stampede Wrestling, a defunct professional wrestling promotion headquartered in Calgary, Alberta, Canada originally known as Big Time Wrestling
 World Class Championship Wrestling, a defunct professional wrestling promotion headquartered in Dallas, Texas, United States originally known as Big Time Wrestling (sometimes NWA Big Time Wrestling)
 Big Time Wrestling Star Wars (1981), a supercard held by World Class Championship Wrestling in 1981